Presidente Prudente is a city in Brazil.

Presidente Prudente may also refer to:

 Prudente de Morais e Barros (1841–1902), third President of Brazil (1894–1898)
 Presidente Prudente Airport
 Roman Catholic Diocese of Presidente Prudente
 Presidente Prudente Formation, a geological formation in São Paulo state, Brazil